Taranjit Singh Sandhu is an Indian diplomat and current Indian Ambassador to the United States. He previously served as High Commissioner of India to Sri Lanka.

Career
Taranjit Singh Sandhu qualified civil services exam and joined the Indian Foreign Service in 1988. He was responsible for opening the Indian embassy in Ukraine and also worked there as head of the political and administration wings. He was the first secretary in Washington. He also worked as consul general in Frankfurt and Deputy Chief of Mission at the Embassy of India in Washington D.C. and Consul General of India in Frankfurt. He has also served at the Ministry of External Affairs, India in different capacities.

Indian Ambassador to the United States
Sandhu presented his credentials to President Donald Trump in early February 2020.

Personal life
Ambassador Sandhu is married to Reenat Sandhu, who was the Ambassador of India to Italy and is now Ambassador of India to The Netherlands. They have two children, a son and a daughter. His interests include books, movies and outdoor sports.

See also
Vijay Gokhale
Dr. S Jaishankar
Navtej Sarna

References

External links
 Ambassador Taranjit’s Bio Data

External links
 India Ambassador, Official page at Embassy of India, Washington, D.C.
 Taranjit Singh Sandhu on Twitter

High Commissioners of India to Sri Lanka
Ambassadors of India to the United States
1963 births
Living people